Wombling Songs is the first album released by the Wombles. "The Wombling Song" was released as a single. The album was written, arranged and performed by Mike Batt, with vocals credited to "the younger Wombles, assisted by Mike Batt".

According to Batt, the album was really just character songs and background music for the television series." However, the album spent 17 weeks in the UK album charts, peaking at number 19 on 2 March 1974.

Track listing
All tracks are written by Mike Batt.
 "The Wombling Song (Television Version)" - 1:40
 "Wombles Everywhere" (3:20)
 "Exercise Is Good for You (Laziness Is Not)" - 2:30
 "The Wombles' Warning" - 3:25
 "Tobermory" - 3:35
 "Dreaming in the Sun (Orinoco's Song)" - 4:10
 "Madame Cholet" - 3:48
 "Great Uncle Bulgaria's March" - 3:28
 "Wellington Womble" - 3:50
 "Bungo's Birthday" - 2:30
 "Wombling Along (Link Piece)" - 0:48
 "The Wombling Song (Full Version)" - 2:25

References

The Wombles albums
1973 debut albums
Albums produced by Mike Batt